Jonny Fa'amatuainu (born 29 December 1983 in Auckland, New Zealand) is a Samoan rugby union player, who currently plays for Colomiers in the French Pro D2 competition. Fa'amatuainu's position of choice is flanker, but he also plays lock.

Club career
Initially, while at high school, Fa’amatuainu played basketball, not rugby. In that sport, he represented New Zealand at under-16 and under-18, and Samoa at under-20 age-group level. He started playing rugby relatively late, at the age of 18, when the rugby coach at his school (De La Salle College, Mangere East in Auckland) asked him to join their rugby team, because the team needed a flanker. After some hesitation, he agreed and it didn’t take long for his (international) rugby career to take off.

In January 2006, Fa’amatuainu joined Bath Rugby in the English Aviva Premiership on a short-term deal but was offered a two-year contract a few months later.

After not getting much game time during the 2009–10 season, and due to the arrival of England captain Lewis Moody and Scotland back-rower Simon Taylor at Bath, Fa’amatuainu left Bath for the Welsh club Scarlets in the Pro12 on a one-season loan for the 2010–11 season.

At the end of the 2010-2011 season, Fa’amatuainu left the Scarlets when he wasn’t offered a new contract.  Instead, he went to Japan to play for the Coca-Cola West Red Sparks in the Top League.  In 2013, Fa’amatuainu joined Toyota Industries Shuttles where he played until 2015.

In 2015, he signed with the French club Colomiers.

International career
Jonny Fa'amatuainu played for the Samoan Sevens team during the 2003–04 and 2004–05 editions of the World Rugby Sevens Series. He made his debut for the Samoa national team in November 2005 against Scotland. He played a total of sixteen games for Samoa, his last against Tonga in July 2011.

References

External links
Bath Rugby profile

1983 births
Living people
New Zealand rugby union players
Bath Rugby players
Scarlets players
Coca-Cola Red Sparks players
Toyota Industries Shuttles Aichi players
US Colomiers players
Expatriate rugby union players in Japan
Expatriate rugby union players in England
Expatriate rugby union players in Wales
Samoa international rugby union players
People educated at De La Salle College, Māngere East
New Zealand expatriate sportspeople in Japan
New Zealand expatriate sportspeople in England
New Zealand expatriate sportspeople in Wales
Rugby union locks